Charles Henry Joachim (July 21, 1920 – March 17, 2002) was an American professional basketball player who played in the National Basketball League for the Youngstown Bears  and Flint Dow A.C.'s.

References

1920 births
2002 deaths
Basketball players from Youngstown, Ohio
Guards (basketball)
Flint Dow A.C.'s players
Forwards (basketball)
High school basketball coaches in the United States
Mount Union Purple Raiders men's basketball players
Youngstown Bears players
American men's basketball players